
Gmina Pleszew is an urban-rural gmina (administrative district) in Pleszew County, Greater Poland Voivodeship, in west-central Poland.

Villages
Apart from the town of Pleszew, Gmina Pleszew contains the villages and settlements of Baranówek, Bógwidze, Borucin, Bronów, Brzezie, Dobra Nadzieja, Grodzisko, Janków, Korzkwy, Kowalew, Kuczków, Lenartowice, Ludwina, Marszew, Nowa Wieś, Pacanowice, Piekarzew, Prokopów, Rokutów, Sowina, Sowina Błotna, Suchorzew, Taczanów Drugi, Taczanów Pierwszy, Zawady, Zawidowice and Zielona Łąka.

Neighbouring gminas
Gmina Pleszew is bordered by the gminas of Blizanów, Chocz, Czermin, Dobrzyca, Gołuchów, Kotlin, Ostrów Wielkopolski and Raszków.

References
Polish official population figures 2006

Pleszew
Pleszew County